The 1922–23 Scottish Cup was the 45th staging of Scotland's most prestigious football knockout competition. The Cup was won by Celtic, who defeated Hibernian 1–0 in the final.

Fourth round

Semi-finals

Final

References

See also
1922–23 in Scottish football

Scottish Cup seasons
1922 in association football
1923 in association football
1922–23 domestic association football cups
Cup